Lanshan is a district of Linyi City,  Shandong Province, China. Lanshan District forms the center of Linyi and is the location of the city's government and cultural sites such as the Yinqueshan Han Tombs Bamboo Slips Museum. It was formerly the Linyi County and the Linyi county-level city, before Linyi was upgraded to a prefecture-level city and its urban center was renamed as Lanshan District.

Administrative divisions
As 2012, this district is divided to 4 subdistricts and 10 towns.
Subdistricts

Towns

Transportation
Linyi railway station and Linyi North railway station are both located here.

References

External links 
 Xzqh.org

County-level divisions of Shandong
Linyi